The Fort Gibson Southern Gospel Music Festival is a Christian music festival held annually in Fort Gibson, Oklahoma, USA, on the third full weekend in July. The festival began in 2008 at Trinity Family Worship as a community outreach but, because of massive audiences, it was later moved to the Fort Gibson High School Auditorium. The festival features local and regional Southern Gospel music artists and is regularly covered on local television and radio stations.The festival is hosted by Terrill White, a local southern gospel music artist and concert promoter.

Past artists
2008
The Gastineaus - Ada, Oklahoma
Native Witness - Hulbert, Oklahoma
The Wallace Family - Emory, Texas
The Bell Sisters - Tahlequah, Oklahoma

2009
The Hawkins Family - Hot Springs, AR
The Jenkins Sisters - Fort Worth, Texas
The Carpitchers - Tahlequah, Oklahoma
One Purpose - Muldrow, Oklahoma
Naomi Carey - Hulbert, Oklahoma

2010
The Homesteaders Quartet - Weleetka, Oklahoma
The Gastineaus - Ada, Oklahoma
The Crusaders Quartet - Magnolia, Arkansas
One Purpose - Muldrow, Oklahoma
Sacred Call - Fort Gibson, Oklahoma
Example of Grace - Fort Gibson, Oklahoma
Naomi Carey - Hulbert, Oklahoma

External links
Fort Gibson Southern Gospel Music Festival

Folk festivals in the United States
Music festivals established in 2008
Gospel music festivals
Tourist attractions in Cherokee County, Oklahoma
2008 establishments in Oklahoma
Annual events in Oklahoma